Eye of the moon may refer to:

 Eye of the Moon, a children's historical novel.
 The Eye of the Moon, a book in the Bourbon Kid series.
 The Eye of the Moon (The Lords of Midnight), an unpublished sequel to The Lords of Midnight videogame series. 
  Eye of the Moon (Egypt), an Egyptian religious symbol also called the Eye of Hathor, the Eye of Horus, and the Eye of Ra 
  The Eye of the Moon (song) a song from the 2014 album Mue by Émilie Simon